The Labour Party was a political party in Morocco.

Profile
The party was founded at its first congress took place on 14 and 15 May 2005. The founders of the party included Abdelkrim Benatik, Omar Seghrouchni and Mohamed el Ouchari.

As of 2013 the president of the party was Abdelkrim Benatik. The party had a centre-left political leaning.

In the parliamentary election, held on 7 September 2007, the party won 5 out of 325 seats. It won 4 out of 395 seats in the parliamentary election, held on 25 November 2011.

References

2005 establishments in Morocco
2013 disestablishments in Morocco
Defunct political parties in Morocco
Defunct social democratic parties
Labour parties
Political parties disestablished in 2013
Political parties established in 2005
Social democratic parties in Africa
Socialist parties in Morocco